Chip of the Flying U is a 1914 American short silent Western film directed by Colin Campbell and starring Tom Mix. It was produced by Selig Polyscope Company and distributed by the General Film Company.

Cast

See also
 Tom Mix filmography

Preservation status
 A copy is preserved incomplete in the Library of Congress collection.

References

External links
 

1914 films
1914 Western (genre) films
American black-and-white films
American silent short films
Films based on American novels
Films directed by Colin Campbell
Selig Polyscope Company films
Silent American Western (genre) films
1910s American films
1910s English-language films